Ram-Zet is an avant-garde metal band formed in Hamar, Norway in 1998.

Genre classification

Ram-Zet's music is very diverse ranging from black metal to thrash metal. It has industrial sounds, progressive structures, and traditional instruments forming a style which some people, including band mastermind Zet, have called "schizo-metal". Their music contains many rare time signatures, unconventional harmonies, and unusual violin parts. They can be regarded as an avant-garde metal band, because of the wide range of genres influencing them.

Ram-Zet's lyrics are strongly linked to a schizophrenia theme. The lyrics of Pure Therapy, Escape, and Intra all revolve around this mental disorder. Forming a story which runs through all three albums, they feature two main characters: a schizophrenic patient in a dubious mental institution (sung by Zet), and a nurse trying to help him evade (sung by Sfinx).

History
Ram-Zet began in 1998 as a one-man project by singer and guitarist Zet (Henning Ramseth), which later evolved into a full-grown band with the arrival of Küth (drums) and Solem (bass), leading to the release of Ram-Zet's debut album Pure Therapy in September 2000.

On 17 March 2007, in the official Ram-Zet forum, Sfinx stated that Ram-Zet is working on new material and would be performing live soon. Later that month it was confirmed further on the official news section of the Ram-Zet website. The news stated that the band has been rehearsing six new songs and working on many more. It was rumored that the album would be coming out sometime in late 2007 but was put on hold when Zet went on tour with Ride the Sky as guest keyboardist/guitarist. According to the band's official MySpace, recording of the new album began on 1 March 2008. It was also stated that the new album would be heavier and slower than previous albums but still would retain some faster moments in their music.

In October 2008 the band took 10 of their songs and re-arranged them for an acoustic concert in their hometown of Hamar. Approximately 200 people got to see this one-time event. The concert was filmed and is expected to be released on DVD in February/March 2010.

In 2013, after releasing five studio albums and 14 years of existence, Ram-Zet took a break indefinitely, before the departure of some of its leading members; in particular, the guitarist Zet became part of the melodic death metal band  Vardøger. That same year, Sfinx joined Viper Solfa, as the female vocalist.

Personnel

Current members
 Zet - vocals, guitar (Ride the Sky)
 SfinX - vocals (ex-For My Pain..., ex-Eternal Tears of Sorrow)
 Küth - drums, percussion (The Kovenant)
 Lanius - bass, didgeridoo (joined during the post Intra period)
 KA - keyboards (joined during recording of Neutralized)

Former members
 Solem - bass (on Pure Therapy and Escape) 2000-2003
 Daniel - bass (on Intra) 2003-2006
 Magnus - keyboards (Return) (left after Intra)2001-2008
 Sareeta - violin, backing vocals (Ásmegin, Solefald) 2001-2009

Related bands
 Zet went on tour with Ride the Sky replacing Kaspar Dahlqvist on keyboard and rhythm guitar in 2007.
 Küth is the current session drummer for black metal/industrial metal band The Kovenant, where he replaced Jan Axel Blomberg (Hellhammer/Von Blomberg) just after the release of the 4th album SETI in 2003.
 Sareeta was also the violinist for folk metal band Ásmegin.
 Sareeta played violin for black progressive metal band In Lingua Mortua and for avant-garde metal band Solefald on their albums Red for Fire and Black for Death.
 Sfinx made some guest vocals for Fallen the album of the Finnish superband   For My Pain and for the melodic death metal band Eternal Tears of Sorrow on their albums Before the Bleeding Sun and Children of the Dark Waters.
 SfinX is working on an album with her own compositions and arrangements. This band is called EndLing and will be released sometime during 2013.

Discography
Studio albums
 Pure Therapy (2000)
 Escape (2002)
 Intra (2005)
 Neutralized (2009)
 Freaks in Wonderland (2012)

References

External links
 Official site
 Official MySpace

Norwegian avant-garde metal musical groups
Norwegian heavy metal musical groups
Musical groups established in 1998
1998 establishments in Norway
Musical groups from Norway with local place of origin missing